
Year 457 (CDLVII) was a common year starting on Tuesday (link will display the full calendar) of the Julian calendar. At the time, it was known as the Year of the Consulship of Constantinus and Rufus (or, less frequently, year 1210 Ab urbe condita). The denomination 457 for this year has been used since the early medieval period, when the Anno Domini calendar era became the prevalent method in Europe for naming years.

Events 
 By place 

 Roman Empire 
 January 27 – Emperor Marcian dies at Constantinople, possibly of foot gangrene, an infection contracted during a long religious journey. He is buried in the Church of the Holy Apostles, together with his late wife Pulcheria.
 February 7 – Leo I, a Thraco-Roman (or Dacian) high-ranking officer, becomes the new emperor of the Eastern Roman Empire, reigning for nearly 20 years. He is first to accept the Byzantine crown from the hands of the patriarch of Constantinople.Edward Gibbon, The Decline and Fall of the Roman Empire, Volume I, Chap. XXXVI (Chicago: Encyclopædia Britannica, Inc., 1952), p. 582.  Bibl.  Theophanes, p. 95 [ed. Par.; tom. i p. 170, ed. Bonn].
 April 1 – Majorian is acclaimed emperor by the Roman army, after defeating 900 Alemanni near Lake Maggiore (Italy).Fasti vindobonenses priores, 583.
 December 28 – Majorian is crowned emperor of the Western Roman Empire and recognized by Pope Leo I. His rule is accepted in Italy, Dalmatia and some territories in Northern Gaul.

 Europe 
 According to the Anglo-Saxon Chronicle, 4,000 Britons are slain at Crecganford in battle against Hengist and his son Oisc of Kent.

 Persia 
 Yazdegerd II dies after a 19-year reign. He is succeeded by his son Hormizd III who seizes the Persian throne. His elder brother Peroz I rebels against him in Sistan (Iran). After months of civil war he defeats Hormizd and becomes the seventeenth Sasanian king of the Persian Empire.

 By topic 

 Religion 
 Victorius of Aquitaine computes new tables for celebrating Easter.

Births 
 Leontia, Roman empress and wife of Anthemius (d. 479)
 Medardus, bishop of Vermandois (approximate date)

Deaths 
 January 27 – Flavius Marcian, Roman emperor (b. 392)
 October 28 – Ibas, bishop of Edessa (modern Turkey)
 Avitus, emperor of the Western Roman Empire
 Merovech, king of the Salian Franks (approximate date)
 Palladius, first bishop of Ireland (approximate date)
 Saint Proterius, Patriarch of Alexandria
 Theodoret of Cyrrhus, bishop and theologian
 Valerian of Abbenza, bishop and saint (b. 377)
 Yazdegerd II, king of the Persian Empire

References